This is a list of the National Register of Historic Places listings in Chambers County, Texas.

This is intended to be a complete list of properties and districts listed on the National Register of Historic Places in Chambers County, Texas. There are two districts and four individual properties listed on the National Register in the county. Two individually listed properties are State Antiquities Landmarks including one that is also a Recorded Texas Historic Landmark.

Current listings

The publicly disclosed locations of National Register properties and districts may be seen in a mapping service provided.

|}

See also

National Register of Historic Places listings in Texas
Recorded Texas Historic Landmarks in Chambers County

References

External links

Chambers County, Texas
Chambers County
Buildings and structures in Chambers County, Texas